Dahmane Defnoun (born 8 May 1936) is a former Algerian football player. He is widely known for being a member of the FLN football team. After Algeria gained its independence in 1962, he went on to make 10 appearances for the Algeria national team.

References

1936 births
Living people
Algerian footballers
Algerian expatriate footballers
Algeria international footballers
Association football midfielders
Footballers from Algiers
Angers SCO players
Olympique Alès players
Algerian expatriate sportspeople in France
Expatriate footballers in France
People from Bologhine
FLN football team players
21st-century Algerian people
20th-century Algerian people